The 7th Lambda Literary Awards were held in 1995 to honour works of LGBT literature published in 1994.

Special awards

Nominees and winners

External links
 7th Lambda Literary Awards

07
Lambda
Lists of LGBT-related award winners and nominees
1995 in LGBT history
1995 awards in the United Kingdom